Pax Praetoriana (or Pax Pretoriana) refers to the relative stability of modern South Africa and the (economically and politically) dominant foreign policy of the country towards the African continent and its encouragement of stable, accountable, democratic governments in other African states. The term Pax Nigeriana is sometimes used in relation to Nigeria's similar status. Both these terms derive from the expression Pax Romana – the Roman peace. The term Praetoriana also derives from Pretoria, the administrative capital city of South Africa.

Critics of South African foreign policy (including political allies of the ANC such as the trade union organization COSATU), especially under former president Thabo Mbeki, point to domestic problems such as unemployment, crime and the scourge of AIDS that remain unresolved, and question the value of the ANC's policy of "quiet diplomacy" towards the Zimbabwean government during its current period of repressive rule.

The term has also been used to describe the dominant position of South Africa over its neighbors in the pre-1994 era, forcing agreements such as the Nkomati Accord between South Africa and Mozambique and a non-aggression treaty with Eswatini.

See also
African Renaissance

Praetoriana
Foreign relations of South Africa
Latin political words and phrases